Valerie McGovern was an Irish radio and television broadcaster. She worked as a continuity announcer, and read the news on RTÉ Television starting in 1977. McGovern presented the programme Summer Lookaround with Bunny Carr on RTÉ TV. The weekly magazine programme, Summer Scene was presented by McGovern, along with Joe Mac Anthony. She was the television commentator of the 1970 Eurovision Song Contest, which Ireland won, for RTÉ.

References

Irish radio presenters
Irish television presenters
Irish women journalists
RTÉ Radio presenters
RTÉ television presenters
Irish women radio presenters
Irish women television presenters